Jean Vincent (29 November 1930 – 13 August 2013) was a French international footballer and manager.

Playing career
Playing primarily at outside-left, Vincent enjoyed a highly successful career at club and international level, winning numerous titles and a run to the semi-finals of the 1958 World Cup.
Lille OSC (1950–1956) – Ligue 1 champion in 1954; Coupe de France winner in 1953 and 1955
Stade Reims (1956–1964) – Ligue 1 champion in 1958, 1960 and 1962; Coupe de France winner in 1958
He earned 46 caps and scored 22 goals for the France national football team, and played and scored in the 1954 FIFA World Cup, the 1958 FIFA World Cup, and the 1960 European Football Championship.

Coaching career
Vincent enjoyed considerable success as a coach at Nantes, taking them to two league championships. Appointed Cameroon's coach for the 1982 World Cup, with a side containing Thomas Nkono and Roger Milla, Cameroon performed admirably and drew all three games, missing out on a place in a second round only on goals scored.

SM Caen
FC La Chaux-de-Fonds
SC Bastia
FC Lorient
FC Nantes – Ligue 1 champion in 1977 and 1980; Coupe de France winner in 1979
Cameroon national football team – coach at the 1982 FIFA World Cup
Stade Rennes
WAC Casablanca
Tunisia national football team

Death
Vincent died on 13 August 2013 at the age of 82.

References

External links
Weltfussball  
Profile on FFF site 

1930 births
2013 deaths
Sportspeople from Pas-de-Calais
French footballers
France international footballers
French football managers
Lille OSC players
Stade de Reims players
Ligue 1 players
1954 FIFA World Cup players
1958 FIFA World Cup players
1960 European Nations' Cup players
1982 FIFA World Cup managers
Cameroon national football team managers
Tunisia national football team managers
Stade Malherbe Caen managers
FC La Chaux-de-Fonds managers
SC Bastia managers
FC Lorient managers
FC Nantes managers
Stade Rennais F.C. managers
Ligue 1 managers
Expatriate football managers in Morocco
Wydad AC managers
Association football wingers
Footballers from Loire-Atlantique
Botola managers